Icon was the debut album by the heavy metal band Icon. It included their biggest metal radio hit song, "On Your Feet". The album was re-released the same year with songs 1 and 3 re-mixed, and a video was made for the remix of "On Your Feet". The album has seen multiple re-releases on CD, in Japan and on the European labels Bear Tracks, AxeKiller and Rock Candy.

Track listing
Side one
"(Rock On) Through the Night" (Dan Wexler, Stephen Clifford, John Aquilino) – 3:31
"Killer Machine" (Aquilino, Wexler) – 3:31
"On Your Feet" (Aquilino, Clifford) – 3:22
"World War" (Wexler, Tracy Wallach, Clifford) – 4:30
"Hot Desert Night" (Wexler, Clifford) – 3:49

Side two
"Under My Gun" (Wexler) – 3:30
"Iconoclast" (Wexler, Aquilino) – 1:26
"Rock n' Roll Maniac" (Wexler, Clifford, Aquilino, Wallach, Pat Dixon) – 3:58
"I'm Alive" (Wexler) – 4:08
"It's Up to You" (Wexler, Clifford, Wallach) – 5:05

Personnel
Icon
Stephen Clifford – vocals
John Aquilino – guitars
Dan Wexler – guitars, vocals
Tracy Wallach – bass, vocals
Pat Dixon – drums

Production
Mike Varney – producer
Allen Sudduth – engineer
Stephen Marcussen – mastering at Precision Lacquer, Hollywood, California
Roy Kohara – art direction 
James Dowlen – cover illustration
John O'Brien – logo design
Rick Monzon – logo illustration
Karen Filter – photography
Volker Kurze – re-issue producer
Peter Morticelli – manager

References

1984 debut albums
Icon (band) albums
Albums produced by Mike Varney
Capitol Records albums